Herschel "Harry" Levit (May 29, 1912 – June 1, 1986) was an American social realist artist, designer, illustrator, author, and educator. In the 1930s and 1940s, he was active in the Federal Art Project sponsored by the Works Progress Administration (WPA). He was a Professor emeritus at Pratt Institute, teaching from 1947 to 1977 and teaching at Parsons School of Design, from 1977 to 1986.

Biography 
Herschel Levit was born in Philadelphia, Pennsylvania on May 29, 1912, to parents Annie and Isadore Levit. His father Isadore had immigrated from Russia. In 1922, his family moved to the town of Shenandoah, Pennsylvania. He studied at the Pennsylvania Academy of the Fine Arts (from 1934 to 1936). In 1939, he was married to Janice (née Hackenburg), and they had a daughter.

During the 1930s and 1940s, he worked in lithography and as a muralist for the Federal Art Project sponsored by the Works Progress Administration (WPA) in Philadelphia. 

Levit taught abstract design and advertising design courses at Pratt Institute, from 1947 until 1977. After his retirement from Pratt he started teaching photography courses at Parsons School of Design from 1977 until 1986. Levit's students included Steve Frankfurt, Bob Giraldi, George Lois, Sheila Metzner, Steve Horn, Stan Richards, and Len Sirowitz.

Levit's work is included in many public museum collections including the National Gallery of Art, the Whitney Museum of American Art, the Metropolitan Museum of Art, Pennsylvania Academy of the Fine Arts, and others. His work was included in the exhibition, Modern Art in Your Life (1949) at the Museum of Modern Art in New York City, New York.

Murals 

 William Penn's treaty (1940) mural at William Rowen School, Philadelphia, Pennsylvania
 General Washington's Troops on Old York Road (1942) tempera mural at the post office, Jenkintown, Pennsylvania, (moved to a new location).
 Crispus Attucks (1943), mural at the Recorder of Deeds building, 515 D St., NW, Washington, D.C.
 Farn and Mill (1941), mural at the post office in Louisville, Ohio, (moved to a new location).

Publications

As illustrator

As author

References

Further reading

External links 
 Herschel Levit Collection, Archives and Special Collections, Elmer L. Andersen Library, University of Minnesota

1912 births
1986 deaths
People from Shenandoah, Pennsylvania
Pennsylvania Academy of the Fine Arts alumni
Pratt Institute faculty
Parsons School of Design faculty
American people of Russian descent
Section of Painting and Sculpture artists